Mbitini is a growing market town in Kitui County, former Eastern Province, Kenya, that is approximately 40 km south-east of Kitui town. It is the administrative centre of Mbitini County Assembly Ward with a total population of 24,858. Most of the inhabitants are poor peasant farmers. The small town is famous for traditional doctors who administer "Ngata", a traditional oath that is believed to protect people from bad omen in life. People from other parts of Kenya and beyond travel to the town especially in the weekends for the 'dose' of protection.

References

Populated places in Eastern Province (Kenya)
Populated places in Kitui County